Carlos Caballero Pérez (born 5 October 1984) is a Spanish retired footballer who played as a midfielder.

Club career
Born in Alcorcón, Madrid, Caballero made his senior debut with local AD Alcorcón in the 2002–03 season, in Segunda División B. In the summer of 2006, he moved to CD Linares in the same league.

On 11 August 2008, Caballero joined Cádiz CF also of division three. He was an ever-present figure in his debut campaign, appearing in 37 matches and scoring six goals as the Andalusians returned to Segunda División after a one-year absence.

Caballero played his first match as a professional on 30 August 2009, starting in a 0–1 home loss against UD Salamanca. He appeared regularly during the season, but his team were eventually relegated.

On 15 June 2011, Caballero moved to Córdoba CF still in the second tier. On 11 November 2012, he scored his first professional goal, his side's fourth in a 5–3 away victory over SD Ponferradina.

Caballero contributed 25 games and five goals in 2013–14, as Córdoba returned to La Liga after more than four decades. He missed the last four months of the season due to an anterior cruciate ligament injury contracted on 23 February 2014 against Real Jaén, and only returned to action on 23 November, playing injury time in a 2–2 away draw with Elche CF which also signified his debut in the Spanish top flight, at the age of 30.

On 30 January 2015, Caballero was loaned to Super League Greece side Veria F.C. until June. He returned to the  Estadio Nuevo Arcángel in July, being sparingly used the following campaigns.

On 24 January 2018, Caballero terminated his contract with Córdoba and signed for CF Fuenlabrada of the third division, for two years. On 3 September 2019, after helping to the club's first-ever promotion to the second tier, he announced his retirement at the age of 34.

References

External links
 
 
 
 
 Stats and bio at Cadistas1910 

1984 births
Living people
People from Alcorcón
Spanish footballers
Footballers from the Community of Madrid
Association football midfielders
La Liga players
Segunda División players
Segunda División B players
AD Alcorcón footballers
CD Linares players
Cádiz CF players
Córdoba CF players
CF Fuenlabrada footballers
Super League Greece players
Veria F.C. players
Spanish expatriate footballers
Expatriate footballers in Greece
Spanish expatriate sportspeople in Greece